Hukou County is a county under the administration of Jiujiang City, in the north of Jiangxi Province, China, bordering Anhui province to the north.

Administrative divisions
Hukou County is divided to 5 towns and 7 townships.
5 towns

7 townships

Transport
Hukou is served by the Tongling–Jiujiang Railway.

Climate

References

External links
Official website of Hukou County Government

County-level divisions of Jiangxi
Jiujiang